Dela Rosa Transit is one of the city bus companies in the Philippines. It plies route from Pacita Complex, San Pedro, Laguna to Novaliches, Quezon City. It also offers provincial routes operated under its sister companies, Dela Rosa Express and N. Dela Rosa Liner, plying routes from Metro Manila to Batangas City, Batangas, and Lucena City, Quezon, respectively. 

The company was named after its sole founder's wife, Nora dela Rosa, who is also an owner of provincial bus company, N. Dela Rosa Liner.

Suspension of operations
On February 5, 2015, A Dela Rosa Transit bus with license plate TYM-449 rammed and crushed a silver 2015 Toyota Vios before sandwiching it against another bus on EDSA in the Muñoz district of Quezon City. The driver of the Vios was trapped for a few minutes, but was later extricated by the MMDA and rushed to the hospital. Following the accident, the Land Transportation Franchising Regulatory Board (LTFRB) ordered the preventive suspension of Dela Rosa Transit and ordered all of the company's drivers to undergo drug testing and road safety seminars within 15 days of the announcement. The bus driver involved in the accident fled the scene, but was later arrested and placed under police custody. Despite his claims that the brakes on the bus failed, he has been charged with reckless imprudence resulting in multiple injuries and damage to property. The driver has since been fired by Dela Rosa Transit.

Fleet
Dela Rosa Transit maintains and utilizes UD Nissan Diesel, Golden Dragon, Guilin Daewoo, Hino, Hyundai Aero Queen, Hyundai Universe Space Luxury, and King Long units, with roughly a total number of 300 buses, including those from N. Dela Rosa Liner.

Routes
Dela Rosa Transit – Sta Rosa Integrated Terminal/Pacita Complex – Novaliches via EDSA/NLEX Malinta Exit (additional special permit provincial bus from SM Lipa Grand Terminal, Lucena Grand Terminal and Batangas City Pier/Grand Terminal due to Holy Week, All Saints Day, All Souls Day and Christmas & New Year Season)
Dela Rosa Express – Lawton/Alabang – Lucena City via Santa Rosa Integrated Terminal/Turbina
N Dela Rosa Liner – Alabang – Batangas City Pier/Grand Terminal via Sta Rosa Integrated Terminal/ACTEX/Calabarzon/Lipa-Tambo Exit
N Dela Rosa Liner (Premium P2P) – Alabang Town Center – Robinsons Place Manila via Alabang – Zapote Road

Destinations
Metro Manila
Noavliches, Quezon City
Alabang, Muntinlupa
Valenzuela Gateway Complex, Valenzuela City
Ermita, Plaza Lawton, Manila
Provincial Destinations
Lucena City, Quezon via Dalahican Port
Pacita Complex, San Pedro, Laguna*
Santa Rosa Integrated Terminal SM City Santa Rosa Laguna*
Batangas Port Terminal, Batangas City via ACTEX
Lipa City, Batangas via SM Lipa Grand Terminal/Robinsons Place Lipa
Tanauan City, Batangas
San Jose, Batangas

(*)operates as part of Dela Rosa Transit's city operation

References

Bus companies of the Philippines
Companies based in Laguna (province)